"Mountains" is a 1986 song by American musician Prince and The Revolution, from his eight album, Parade (1986), and the soundtrack to the film Under the Cherry Moon. It was written by The Revolution members Wendy & Lisa together with Prince. The extended 12" single version of the song runs nearly ten minutes. It reached number 23 in the US but only 45 in the UK. The B-side was the instrumental "Alexa de Paris", one of the few tracks from this project featuring a guitar solo. Both songs appear in the film Under the Cherry Moon, with the video for "Mountains" playing as the credits roll. The version shown on MTV to promote the single was in color as opposed to the film's black-and-white version. 

"Mountains" was often performed in his live concerts. A music video, directed by Prince was released in April 1986.

Track listings
 7-inch single
 "Mountains" – 3:58
 "Alexa de Paris" – 3:20

 12-inch single
 "Mountains" (Extended Version) – 10:03
 "Alexa de Paris" (Extended Version) – 4:54

Personnel
 Prince – lead vocals and various instruments
 Lisa Coleman – keyboards and vocals
 Wendy Melvoin – guitar and vocals
 Dr. Fink – keyboards
 Brown Mark – bass
 Bobby Z. – drums and percussion
 Eric Leeds – saxophone
 Atlanta Bliss – trumpet
 Miko Weaver – rhythm guitar
 Clare Fischer – orchestral arrangements

Charts

References

1986 singles
1986 songs
Music videos directed by Prince (musician)
Paisley Park Records singles
Prince (musician) songs
Song recordings produced by Prince (musician)
Songs written for films
Songs written by Lisa Coleman (musician)
Songs written by Prince (musician)
Songs written by Wendy Melvoin
Warner Records singles